Alexander Levine (Russian: Александр Левин; born 17 November 1955), is a Russian-born British composer. He writes choral, chamber and orchestral music, publishing through Edition Peters.

Background 
Alexander Levine was born in Moscow in 1955. As a child he attended the Gnessin State Musical College (Gnessin School of Music) and then studied at the Gnessin Academy (1976-1980).

In 1992 he relocated to the U.K. where he lives and works at present.

After winning the Wingate Foundation scholarship he studied on the Advanced Postgraduate Composition Course at the Guildhall School of Music and Drama (Master of Music in Composition, 1995).

He started his UK career working on a number of theatre projects. In 1994 he received a commission to write music for a theatre production of “War and Peace” staged at the GSMD (Director Peter Clough). The music was performed live by symphony orchestra. The Times observed in its review: "It is not often you go to the theatre and get an orchestra thrown in: not providing cues for numbers but underscoring dialogue with a grand swell, like a soundtrack for the big screen" (Kate Bassett, The Times, October 29, 1994) Other theatre works of that period: “The Beggar's Opera” and “Love's Labour's Lost” (Director Di Trevis)

Further collaborations include various artists from a wide range of genres: Maria Friedman, Christian Forshaw, Stanzeleit/Jacobson Duo, Darragh Morgan, Mary Dullea, Fidelio Trio, Konstantin Boyarsky, Andrew McNeill, Bozidar Vukovic, Tippett Quartet, Orlando Consort, BBC Singers, 21st Century Choir, Tenebrae, Mariinsky Opera Choir, Russia State Orchestra “Novaia Rossia”, Bel Canto Chorus, Voces8, Paul Phoenix & Apollo5.

Selected works from Edition Peters catalogue 
Prayers for Mankind. A Symphony of Prayers of Father Alexander Men’
 US Premiere: October 12, 2012, Milwaukee, Bel Canto Chorus, director Richard Hynson
 Recording: Tenebrae, director Nigel Short, Signum Records. London, 2010.
 Publisher: Edition Peters

The Divine Liturgy of St John Chrysostom
 World Premiere: St. Petersburg, 2009, Mariinsky Opera Choir, conductor Andrey Petrenko.
 UK premiere: March 7, 2013, London. Tenebrae Choir, director Nigel Short.
 Australian Premiere: Aug. 2014, St George's Cathedral, Perth, St George's Cathedral Consort, Director Joseph Nolan (organist)
 Recording: Tenebrae Choir, director Nigel Short, Signum Records, London, 2013.
 Publisher: Edition Peters

Canti Augustini
 World Premiere: December 21, 2013, St. Petersburg, Mariinsky Theatre by Voces8
 Publisher:Edition Peters
Oh, You Wide Steppe
 Recording:  Paul Phoenix & Apollo5, Edition Peters Sounds
 Publisher: Edition Peters
Natasha's Waltz
 Recording: State Symphony Orchestra “Novaya Rossiya”, Artistic Director and Chief Conductor Yuri Bashmet.
 Publisher: Edition Peters
The True Light
 Publisher: Edition Peters
Thy Will Be Done
 World Premiere: 2014, by Suzi Digby and the Voce Chamber Choir
 Publisher: Edition Peters

Tibi Solus
 Publisher: Edition Peters
I Am All Along on the Road

 Commissioned by the King’s Singers,   UK premiere May 6, 2019, Wigmore Hall
 Publisher: Edition Peters

Our Father (Thy Will Be Done)

 Commissioned by VOCES 8, World Premiere February 8, 2020, St. Andrew’s Anglican Church, Moscow.  
 Publisher: Edition Peters

Discography 
Oh,You Wide Steppe, arr.

Paul Phoenix & Apollo5, "Journey", Edition Peters Sounds, 2015, EPS002

The Divine Liturgy of St. John Chrysostom

Tenebrae, conductor Nigel Short, Signum Classics, 2013, SIGCD316

Prayers for Mankind (A Symphony of Prayers)

Tenebrae, conductor Nigel Short, Signum Classics, 2010, SIGCD212

Kolokolá

The BBC Singers, cond. James Morgan, Albany Records, 2005, TROY 736

Faces (prelude & fugue for saxophone quartet)

Quartz Saxophone Quartet, Black Box, 2000, BBM1024

References

External links 
 
 Alexander Levine on Edition Peters
 Alexander Levine on Hyperion
 Alexander Levine: "Prayers for Mankind"
 A. Levine: "Prayers for Mankind" on Gramophone 
 Alexander Levine: The Divine Liturgy of St. John Chrysostom
 A. Levine: “The Divine Liturgy of St. John Chrysostom” on Gramophone

1955 births
Living people
Russian male classical composers
British male classical composers
British classical composers
21st-century classical composers
Russian Orthodox Christians from Russia
21st-century British male musicians